= Carleete =

Carleete was the stage name of Harry Howes who claimed to be the inventor of the Water Escape trick, also known as the Water Torture Cell, Under Water Escape and Mysterious Cask. This trick was sold to Harry Houdini in 1911.
